Human Technology is an open-access peer-reviewed academic journal focusing on the interaction between people and technology. As of September 2021, the journal is published by the Centre of Sociological Research in Szczecin, Poland. Previously, the journal was co-published by the Agora Center and the University of Jyväskylä (2005-2016), and then by the Open Science Centre and the University of Jyväskylä (2017-2021). Initially, the journal published biannually; it has been published three times a year since 2018.

Editors
Kristiina Korjonen-Kuusipuro (current)
Adam Wojciechowski (current)
Jukka Jouhki (2018-2021) 
Pertti Hurme (2015-2017)
Päivi Häkkinen (2012-2014)
Pertti Saariluoma (2005-2011), founding editor

Indexing
Human Technology is listed in the Directory of Open Access Journals (Lund University Libraries), and is cited and/or abstracted in various databases, including: Scopus, PsycINFO (American Psychological Association), Ebsco and ProQuest.

See also 
 Affective computing
 Technology and society
 Educational technology
 Learning platform

References

External links
 

Science and technology magazines
Philosophy journals
Organizational psychology journals
Sociology journals
Biannual journals
Publications established in 2005